Fløjtespilleren is a 1953 Danish family film directed by Alice O'Fredericks.

Cast
 Helga Frier - Cirkusdirektør Karla
 Peter Malberg - Laurits 'Laust' Jeppesen
 Poul Reichhardt - Kurt / Martin Vest
 Grethe Holmer - Bodil Nielsen
 Ib Schønberg - Onkel Hans
 Ib Mossin - René
 Louis Miehe-Renard - Jack Hviid
 Jeanne Darville - Rosa 'Anita' Mogensen
 Ove Rud - Frank Otto Munk
 Jakob Nielsen - Sorte Henrik
 Thorkil Lauritzen - Sprechstallmeister
 Beatrice Bendtsen - Kvinde i merkanteri
 Ole Neumann - Dreng
 Rudi Hansen - Cirkuspige
 Otto Møller Jensen - Cirkusdreng
 Knud Hallest - Toldbetjent
 Povl Wøldike - Læge
 Irene Hansen - Marianne
 Alma Olander Dam Willumsen - Kurts mor (as Alma Olander Dam)
 Margrethe Nielsen - Fru Hviid
 Hans Egede Budtz - Kommandør

References

External links

1953 films
1950s Danish-language films
Danish black-and-white films
Films directed by Alice O'Fredericks
Films scored by Sven Gyldmark
Danish drama films
1953 drama films